The House of Chalon-Arlay was a French noble house, a cadet branch of the House of Ivrea. The founder of the house is John I of Chalon-Arlay, fifth son of John, Count of Chalon. When John III lord of Arlay married to Mary de Baux, princess of Orange, the House acquired the principality of Orange.

Notable members
 John I of Chalon-Arlay lord of Arlay.
 Hugh I of Chalon-Arlay lord of Arlay.
 John II of Chalon-Arlay lord of Arlay.
 Hugh II of Chalon-Arlay lord of Arlay and his brother Louis I of Chalon-Arlay lord of Arguel & Cuiseaux
 John III of Chalon-Arlay lord of Arlay, married to Mary of Baux princess of Orange. Thus the principality of Orange passed from the House de Baux to the House of Chalon-Arlay. Mary's mother was Jeanne, daughter of Amadeus III count of Geneva.
 Louis II of Chalon-Arlay prince of Orange. After the last count of Geneva from the House of his mother Mary, Louis II claimed the county but failed to acquire it. 
 William VII of Chalon-Arlay prince of Orange.
 John IV of Chalon-Arlay prince of Orange.
 Philibert of Chalon prince of Orange and his sister Claudia of Chalon. The last members of the House. Philibert inherited the properties to Claudias' son, René, and then to the cousin of René, William the Silent. The two cousins were members of the House of Nassau-Dillenburg, to which the principality passed.

Family tree of House of Chalon-Arlay

Gallery of Arms of House of Chalon-Arlay

See also
Chalon-Arlay

|-

|-

References